Sui County or Suixian is a county under the administration of the prefecture-level city of Shangqiu, in the east of Henan province, People's Republic of China, with the population of about  as of 2010 and an area of . The county seat is Chengguan Township

Administrative divisions
As 2012, this county is divided to 8 towns and 12 townships.
Towns

Townships

Climate

References

County-level divisions of Henan
Shangqiu